Emily is a feminine given name derived from the Roman family name "Aemilius", and is the feminine form of the name Emil.

Popularity
Emily has been a hugely popular name in the English-speaking world, ranking among the most popular names in the United States, Canada, the United Kingdom, Ireland, Australia, and New Zealand. It held the position for over a decade as the most common name given to girls in the United States but fell to sixth place in 2009. In 2013, it was the sixth most popular name for girls in Australia. It is also a common name in numerous other countries.

Name variants
Alternate forms include:
Aemilia (Latin)
Aemiliana (Latin)
Aemilianus (Latin)
Aemilius (Latin)
Aimil (Scottish Gaelic)
Aimilios (Greek)
Ái My (Vietnamese)
Amilia (English)
Eemeli (Finnish)
Eemi (Finnish)
Eemil (Finnish)
Eimíle (Irish)
Em (English)
Emalee (English)
Emelie (Swedish)
Emely (English)
Emiel (Dutch)
Emil (Bulgarian), (Croatian), (Czech), (Danish), (English), (German), (Hungarian), (Icelandic), (Macedonian), (Norwegian), (Polish), (Romanian), (Russian), (Serbian), (Slovak), (Slovene), (Swedish)
Émile (French)
Emilee (English)
Emili (Catalan)
Emili (Hebrew), (Hungarian)
Emília (Hungarian), (Portuguese), (Slovak)
Emilía (Icelandic)
Emilia (Bulgarian), (Danish), (English), (Finnish), (German), (Italian), (Norwegian), (Polish), (Romanian), (Spanish), (Swedish)
Emilian (Polish), (Romanian)
Emiliana (Italian), (Portuguese), (Spanish)
Emiliano (Italian), (Spanish)
Émilie (French)
Emílie (Czech)
Emilie (Danish), (German), (Norwegian), (Swedish)
Émilien (French)
Émilienne (French)
Emīlija (Latvian)
Emilija (Croatian), (Lithuanian), (Macedonian), (Serbian), (Slovene)
Emílio (Portuguese)
Emilio (Italian), (Spanish)
Emilios (Greek)
Emilis (Lithuanian)
Emiliya (Bulgarian)
Emīlija (Latvian)
Emily (English)
Emlyn (Welsh)
Emmi (Finnish)
Emmie (English)
Emmy (English), (French)
Emy (French)
Milja (Finnish)
Mille (Danish), (Norwegian), (Swedish)
Millie (English)
Milly (English), (Norwegian), (Swedish)
Yemelyan (Russian)

People with the name

Academics 
 Emily Ying Yang Chan (born 1974), Hong Kong SAR academic

Actresses 
 Emily Barclay (born 1984), New Zealand actress
 Emily Beecham (born 1984), English Actress
 Emily Blunt (born 1983), English actress
 Emily Booth (born 1976), English actress and TV presenter
 Emily Browning (born 1988), Australian actress
 Emily Burnett (born 1996), Welsh actress
 Emily Coutts (born 1989), Canadian actress
 Emily Deschanel (born 1976), American actress
 Emily Gimmel (born 1984), American journalist and TV personality
 Emily Hampshire (born 1981), Canadian actress
 Emily Joyce (born 1969), British actress
 Emily Kagan (born 1981), American mixed martial artist
 Emily Kinney (born 1985), American actress, singer, and songwriter
 Emily Lloyd (born 1970), British actress
 Emily Lloyd-Saini, Bristish actress, broadcaster, writer and comedian
 Emily Mortimer (born 1971), English actress
 Emily Osment (born 1992), American actress and singer, who is best known for playing a character in Hannah Montana
 Emily Perkins (born 1977), Canadian actress
 Emily Procter (born 1968), American actress
 Emily Ratajkowski (born 1991), American actress
 Emily Bett Rickards (born 1991), Canadian actress
 Emily Robins (born 1989), New Zealand actress
 Emily Rose (actress) (born 1981), American actress
 Emily Rutherfurd (born 1974), American actress
 Emily or Emma Stone (born 1988), American actress
 Emily VanCamp (born 1986), Canadian actress
 Emily Watson (born 1967), English actor

Musicians 
 Emily Bauer (born 1981), American singer
 Emily Haines (born 1974), Canadian indie rock singer-songwriter
 Emily Magee (born 1968), American soprano 
 Emily Remler (1957–1990), American jazz guitarist
 Emily Robison (born 1972), American songwriter
 Emily Saliers (born 1963), American singer-songwriter
 Emily Smith (singer) (born 1981), Scottish folk singer

Sportswomen
 Emily Cross (born 1986), American foil fencer
 Emily Csikos (born 1988), Canadian water polo player
 Emily Gillam (born 1977), New Zealand field hockey player
 Emily Hughes (born 1989), American figure skater
 Emily Jacobson (born 1985), American saber fencer
 Emily Kukors (born 1985), American swimmer
 Emily LeSueur (born 1972), American synchronized swimmer
 Emily Samuelson (born 1990), American figure skater
 Emily Seebohm (born 1992), Australian swimmer
 Emily Silver (born 1985), American swimmer
 Emily Hood Westacott (1910–1980), Australian tennis player
 Emily Westwood (born 1984), English football player
Emily Whitehead (born 2000), Australian artistic gymnast

Writers 
 Emily Barton (born 1969), American novelist
 Emily Bazelon (born 1971), American journalist
 Emily Lucas Blackall (1832-1892), American writer, philanthropist 	
 Emily St. John Bouton (1837–1927), American educator, journalist, author, editor 	
 Emily Brontë (1818–1848), English novelist, author of Wuthering Heights
 Emily Carr (1871–1945), Canadian artist and writer
 Emily Thornton Charles (1845-1895), American poet, journalist, suffragist, newspaper founder
 Emily Dickinson (1830–1886), American poet
 Emily Gerard (1849–1905), British author
 Emily Gravett (born 1972), British children's author and illustrator
 Emily Arnold McCully (born 1939), American children's author
 Emily Julian McManus (1865-1918), Canadian poet, author, and educator
 Emily Mkamanga (1949–2021), Malawian writer and social commentator
 Emily Cheney Neville (1919–1997), American author
 Emily Sullivan Oakey (1829–1883), American educator, author, poet, hymnist
 Emily Rebecca Page (1823-1908), American poet 
 Emily Perkins (novelist) (born 1970), New Zealand author
 Emily Jane Pfeiffer (1827–1890), Welsh poet, philanthropist 
 Emily Post (1872–1960), American author on etiquette
 Emily Prager, American author and journalist
 Emily Lee Sherwood Ragan (1839–1916), American author, journalist
 Emily Smith (author), British children's author
 Emily Elizabeth Veeder (1841-?), American author

Others 
 Emily Ayckbowm (1836–1900), English founder of the Community of the Sisters of the Church
 Emily Bisharat (died 2004), Jordanian suffragette, philanthropist, and the first female lawyer in the Kingdom of Jordan
 Emily Blackwell (1826–1910), American academic
Emily Blathwayt (1852–1940), British suffragette, mother of Mary Blathwayt
 Emily Rose Bleby (1849-1917), Jamaican-born British temperance reformer
 Emily Brooke (born 1985), British inventor
 Emmelia of Caesarea (a.k.a. Saint Emily) (d. 375), mother of Basil the Great
 Emily Parmely Collins (1814–1909), American suffragist, activist, writer
 Emily Davison (1872–1913), British suffragette
 Emily Dievendorf, American politician
 Emily Donelson (1807–1836), daughter-in-law of and First Lady under Andrew Jackson
 Emily Greene Balch (1867–1961), American academic, pacifist and Nobel Laureate
 Emily Harris, terrorist with the Symbionese Liberation Army
 Emily Hobhouse (1860–1926), British welfare campaigner
 Emily Caroline Chandler Hodgin (1838-1907), American temperance reformer
 Emily Kame Kngwarreye (1910–1996) indigenous Australian artist
 Emily Waita Macharia (born 1979), Kenyan public relations officer
 Emily Morse (born 1970), sex therapist, author, and media personality
 Emily Murphy (1868–1933), Canadian feminist
 Emily Pankhurst (1858–1928), English political activist and leader of the British suffragette movement
 Emily Austin Perry (1795–1851), Texas historical figure
 Emily McGary Selinger (1848–1927), American painter, writer, poet, educator 
 Emily Shenkl (1910–1996), a leader in the Indian Independence Movement
 Emily Sherwin, American law professor
 Emily Pitts Stevens (1841–1906), American educator, activist, editor, publisher 	
 Emily Taylor (1795–1872), English schoolmistress, poet, children's writer, hymnwriter 	
 Emily Vontz (born 2000), German politician 	
 Emily Waheneka (1919-2008), Native American artist
 Emily Kathryn Wyant (1897–1942), American mathematician
 Emily Young (born 1951), British sculptor
 Emily Young (film director) (born 1970), English film director and screenwriter
 Sagufta Yasmin Emily, Bangladesh Awami League politician and Member of Parliament

Fictional characters
 Emily (Emelye), the maiden whose hand cousins Arcite and Palamon compete for in The Knight's Tale
 Emily Arrow, main female character in Patricia Reilly Giff’s Polk Street School series
 Emily Barham, the female lead in the 1964 film The Americanization of Emily, played by Julie Andrews 
 Emily Bartlett, heroine of Beverly Cleary's Emily's Runaway Imagination
 Emily Bennett, in the CW fantasy-drama TV series The Vampire Diaries
 Emily Bishop, in the British soap opera Coronation Street
 Emily Byrne, main character of the Absentia TV series
 Emily Chester, title character of the 1864 American novel by Anne Moncure Crane
Emily Davis, one of eight protagonists in the survival horror game Until Dawn
 Emily Drozynski, main character in the western drama Yellowstone (American TV series)
 Emily Dyer, a survivor in the video game Identity V
 Emily Elizabeth, in the PBS animated preschool TV series Clifford the Big Red Dog, voiced by Grey DeLisle
 Emily the Emerald Fairy, in the Rainbow Magic book franchise
 Emily Eyefinger, main character of the Emily Eyefinger series about a girl with an eye on her finger
 Emily Fields, major character in the TV series Pretty Little Liars
 Emily Fitch, in the TV series Skins
 Emily Gilmore, in the TV series Gilmore Girls
 Emily Grierson, main character of  William Faulkner's short story "A Rose for Emily"
 Emily Kaldwin, of Dishonored series
 Emily Morgen in the TV series Prison Break
  Emily Nelson, main character from A Simple Favour
 Emily O'Malley, main character of the Delicious video game series
 Emily Pollifax, heroine of The Mrs. Pollifax series of spy-mystery novels by Dorothy Gilman
 Emily Prentiss, on the CBS crime drama Criminal Minds
  Emily Rose, the lead character of the film Exorcism of Emily Rose
 Emily Quartermaine, on the ABC soap opera General Hospital
 Emily Byrd Starr, heroine of L. Maud Montgomery's Emily of New Moon novels
 , in The Idolmaster Million Live!
 Emily Thorne, main character in the TV drama Revenge
 Emily Windsnap, main character in a series of novels by Liz Kessler
 Emily Young, in Twilight (novel series)
 Emily the Strange, cartoon character and merchandising mascot
 Emily, in the Nickelodeon TV series Power Rangers Samurai
 Emily (Thomas & Friends), anthropomorphic steam locomotive in the British children's TV series Thomas & Friends
 Emily, protagonist of Glitter Force

See also
Amelia (given name)
Emil (given name)
Emilee (given name)
Emilia (given name)
Émilie, a French feminine given name
Emilie Meng (1998–2016), Danish teenager who was murdered
Emilio (given name)
Emma (given name)

Notes

Feminine given names
English feminine given names